Chenay may refer to the following places in France:

 Chenay, Marne, a commune in the Marne department
 Chenay, Sarthe, a commune in the Sarthe department
 Chenay, Deux-Sèvres, a commune in the Deux-Sèvres department
 Chenay-le-Châtel, a commune in the Saône-et-Loire department